Parliamentary elections were held in Bulgaria on 20 December 1953. Voters were presented with a single list from the Fatherland Front, dominated by the Bulgarian Communist Party. As the Fatherland Front was the only organisation to contest the election and all candidate lists had to be approved by the Front (per an electoral law adopted in 1953), voters only had the option of voting for or against the Front list. Only 0.2% of vote were cast against the Front. Voter turnout was reportedly 99.5%.

Results

References

Bulgaria
1953 in Bulgaria
Parliamentary elections in Bulgaria
One-party elections
1953 elections in Bulgaria
December 1953 events in Europe